The National Kidney and Transplant Institute is a tertiary referral hospital located in Central, Quezon City, Philippines. The hospital opened on January 16, 1981.

The National Kidney and Transplant Institute, or NKTI, is a tertiary medical specialty center for renal health. The hospital also offers voluntary blood services.

The hospital was formerly known as the National Kidney Foundation of the Philippines (NKFP), and the National Kidney Institute.

Building and location 
The National Kidney and Transplant Institute sits in the center of a  lot, along East Avenue in Quezon City.

The Institute itself is 3-storey structure with three buildings (Main, Annex and Dialysis Center) connected to each other. The Main Building houses most of the Cost Centers and where the Administrative offices can be found. The Annex Building encloses the recently opened Marcos Wing and the Radiology Dept (MRI and CT Scan centers), Center for Special Services and also the ER Dept.

Services

In its nearly three decades of operations, NKTI has always aimed for general patient care and the prevention or treatment of renal disease; and gained various achievements: double transplant - kidney & pancreas (first in Asia, March 1988); Kidney - Liver transplant (first in Asia, September 1990); Bone Marrow Transplant (first in the Philippines, August 1990); ISO-Certification (first Government Hospital in the Philippines, February 2003). The institute has continuously maintained various healthcare-related programs  such the Human Organ Preservation Effort (HOPE), Voluntary Blood Donation Program (VBDP), Renal Disease Control Program (REDCOP) and Total Quality Management (TQM)

References

External links
 

Hospitals in Quezon City
Government-owned and controlled corporations of the Philippines
Buildings and structures in Quezon City
Organ transplantation
Establishments by Philippine presidential decree